Hardcore Zen: Punk Rock, Monster Movies, & the Truth about Reality is a book written by Brad Warner, an author and ordained Zen priest.  It was released in October 2003 by Wisdom Publications.  The work serves as both an autobiography and an introduction to Sōtō Zen philosophy.

Reception
Hardcore Zen received mostly positive reviews. Publishers Weekly said of the book, "Entertaining, bold and refreshingly direct, this book is likely to change the way one experiences other books about Zen—and maybe even the way one experiences reality." Tricycle: The Buddhist Review said "Hardcore Zen is Be Here Now for now."

Publication data 
 Hardcore Zen: Punk Rock, Monster Movies, & the Truth about Reality, Brad Warner, Wisdom Publications (October 2003), 224 pages,

References

2003 non-fiction books
Zen studies books
Zen art and culture